The Victory Yard was a temporary expansion of the General Dynamics Electric Boat facility in Groton, Connecticut, to dramatically increase submarine construction during World War II.

Early property ownership
On 5 February 1942, the US Navy purchased the former Groton Iron Works property from Alfred Holter and Shell Oil Company for $222,000 using condemnation proceedings. $9.5 million was spent to construct the Victory Yard, where General Dynamics Electric Boat began building submarines on 22 July 1942. On 3 November 1943 a Federal Court Committee awarded an additional $203,000 to the former owners.

Submarines built at the Victory Yard

Subsequent property uses
On 13 January 1945, General Dynamics Electric Boat announced that $3,000,000 will be spent to convert the Victory Yard to manufacture 105mm shells.

On 18 December 1946, Pfizer Inc purchased the property from the War Assets Administration. Purchase price was $911,999.

References 

Shipyards of the United States